Skudin is a Russian masculine surname originating from the word  meaning 'poverty, need, lack'; its feminine counterpart is Skudina. It may refer to:
Will Skudin, American surfer
Yekaterina Skudina (born 1981), Russian Olympic sailor

References

Russian-language surnames